Haldiram's is an Indian multinational sweets, snacks and restaurant company headquartered in Nagpur. The company has  manufacturing plants in a wide variety of locations such as Nagpur, New Delhi, Gurgaon, Hooghly, Rudrapur and Noida. Haldiram's has its own retail chain stores and a range of restaurants in Pune, Nagpur, Raipur, Kolkata, Noida and Delhi.

History
Haldiram's was founded in 1937 by Ganga Bishan Agarwal, fondly known as Haldiram Ji in his household; as a retail sweets and namkeen shop in Bikaner, Rajasthan.

In order to drive expansion, the company's first manufacturing plant was started in Calcutta (now Kolkata). In 1970, a larger manufacturing plant was established in Jaipur. Another manufacturing plant was established in New Delhi, the capital of India, in the early 1990s. In 2003, the company began the process of developing convenience foods to be marketed to consumers. In 2014, Haldiram's was ranked 55th among India's most trusted brands according to the Brand Trust Report; a study conducted by Trust Research Advisory. The company has grown at a tremendous pace over the years and in 2017 it was crowned as the country's largest snack company, surpassing all other domestic and international competitors. Haldiram's products are available in more than 80 countries.In 2006 Haldiram Owner Mahesh was held guilty for trying to murder a Tea Seller

Products
Haldiram's has over 410 products. Its product range includes traditional namkeens, western snacks, Indian Sweets, cookies, sherbets, and pickles such as gulab jammun and Bikaneri bhujia and papadum. The company also produces ready-to-eat food products. In the 1990s, the production of potato-based foods was enabled by the importation of machinery from United States designed for these purposes.

Haldiram's products are marketed at various retail locations such as bakeries and confectionery stores, among others, and also on various commercial websites. The pricing of the company's products is typically inexpensive compared to similar products made by other companies. Prior and up to August 2003 in the United States market, the company's products were limited to potato chips. The company's products are carried by some Indian supermarkets in U.S. In U.S., Haldiram's products are popular with the Indian diaspora.

Advertising 
Haldiram's is very traditional in terms of advertising and promotions. However, to be in sync with current times, Haldiram's tied up with the 2015 Bollywood film Prem Ratan Dhan Payo and more than 1.5 crore (15 million) Haldiram's snack packets were printed with the logo of the film. The chain is actively expanding its franchises.

References

External links

 

Confectionery companies of India
Companies based in Nagpur
Fast-food chains of India
Brand name potato chips and crisps
Indian brands
Indian companies established in 1937
Food and drink companies established in 1937